Fantozzi va in pensione ("Fantozzi Retires") is a 1988 Italian comedy film directed by Neri Parenti. It is the sixth chapter in the Fantozzi film series of the unlucky clerk Ugo Fantozzi, played by its creator, Paolo Villaggio.

Plot 
The accountant Fantozzi has reached the retirement age and left the work: he is now finally free from the stress of work but boredom seems to take over. He then tries the political activity, adopts a "puppy", goes on a trip to Venice, tries to find new jobs. He eventually came back to work at his former company in exchange for his pension.

Cast 
 Paolo Villaggio as Ugo Fantozzi
 Milena Vukotic as  Pina Fantozzi
 Gigi Reder as  Filini
 Plinio Fernando as  Mariangela Fantozzi / Uga Fantozzi
 Anna Mazzamauro as  Mrs. Silvani
 Paul Muller as Duke Count Francesco Maria Barambani 
 Antonio Allocca as The Examiner
 Pino Ferrara as Accountant Fonelli
 Albano Bufalini as Mr. Colsi

References

External links

1988 comedy films
1988 films
Films directed by Neri Parenti
Italian comedy films
1980s Italian films